1 Queen 5 Queers is a Canadian television talk show, which premiered on Crave in 2021. A revival of the 2009-2014 MTV Canada series 1 Girl 5 Gays, the series features a panel of LGBTQ people talking about LGBTQ issues, moderated by drag queen Brooke Lynn Hytes. According to Hytes, the series represents a broader and more diverse array of participants than the original, which focused almost entirely on the perspectives of gay men.

The series debuted on December 9, 2021. Panelists appearing on the series have included choreographer Hollywood Jade, comedian Tricia Black, actor and athlete Harrison Browne, fashion designer Isaac Mizrahi, advocate and dancer Raymond Johnson-Brown, and musician and writer Our Lady J.

References

2021 Canadian television series debuts
2020s Canadian television talk shows
2020s Canadian LGBT-related television series
Crave original programming
Drag (clothing) television shows